Bagale Thapa ( pronunciation:) anciently known as Bagalya Thapa is a prominent clan within Thapa of Khas community. They claim Atreya Gotra. The name of the clan is also transliterated as Bagale, Bagalya, Bagaalya, Bagaliya, Bagaley, Bagaale or Bagaleya.

Family of Bhimsen Thapa and family of Amar Singh Thapa were two influential Bagale Thapa families at the central politics of Kingdom of Nepal.

Origins

Bagale Thapa genealogy
 

The genealogy traces the lineage of all Bagale Thapas to a male progenitor (Mūlapuruṣa) Kalu Thapa Kshatri. The genealogy states that Kalu Thapa had four sons; Punyakar of Pulaam state, Tarapati of Takam state, Biru and Dharmaraj (Jashodhar) of Jamarik state. The genealogy describes that Kaalu adhered to the following sects: "Aatreya gotri Tripravara, Shukla Yajurveda, Dhanurveda and Madhyandini Shakha".

Kunwar family legend
Kunwar family legend mentions that their first ancestor Rāma Siṃha Rāṇā was married to a daughter of Raja (King) of Bīnātī, a Bagāle Kṣetrī on the request by his employer hill Raja. John Whelpton opines that the legend of the Kunwar family's origins, which says their progenitor to have entered hill and married a daughter of Bagale Kshetri, might have linked their family to the Bagale Thapa, a clan of the Mukhtiyar Bhimsen Thapa.

History

Khas Thapas belong to the Chhetri caste of the Kshatriya Varna whose origin lies in Karnali region of Khas Kingdom. Bagale Thapas were powerful and prominent family at Jumla and seemed to have migrated eastwards.

Takam/Takamkot State
 Takam State (1246-1545 B.S.) (1189-1488 CE) was used as an arsenal by the Bagale Thapa clan. In 1545 B.S. (1488 CE), King Dimba Bam Malla defeated these Thapas and annexed all the districts of Dhawalagiri Zone to create a bigger Parbat State. The Bagale Thapa clan of Takamkot established their arsenal in this Takamkot (Takam State) and controlled it between 1189 and 1488 CE, after which the Malla kings captured and controlled it from 1489 to 1825 CE.

Malla era Kathmandu
In the times of Malla rule at Kathmandu valley, Bagale Thapas were considered skillful at both warfare and administration. Thus, King Jagajjaya Malla attended the services of Kashiram Thapa, a leader of Bagale Thapas to control inobedient Khas and Magar citizens. His brother Parashuram Thapa, a commander of Bhaktapur Kingdom, sided to Gorkha Kingdom when Kashiram Thapa was killed without justification.

Noble families in Gorkha
Family of Bhimsen Thapa and family of Amar Singh Thapa were two influential Bagale Thapa families at the central politics of Kingdom of Nepal.

The family of Bada Kaji Amar Singh Thapa consists Kaji Ranajor Singh Thapa, Ranadhoj Thapa, Narsingh Thapa and their 2 more brothers who were also at Royal Court of Nepal. Amar Singh Thapa, one of the National heroes of Nepal and commander of Western front at Anglo-Nepalese war belonged to this clan.

The family of Kaji Bir Bhadra Thapa, commander of Unification of Nepal belonged to this clan. This family contains large number of renowned courtiers and warriors. He had three sons: Jeevan Thapa(died at Battle of Kirtipur), Bangsha Raj Thapa and Amar Singh Thapa (Sardar).  The children of Amar Singh Thapa (Sardar) become influential. Prime Minister Bhimsen Thapa, the most revered among Thapas is the eldest son of Sardar Amar Singh Thapa(sanu). His nephew, son of Nain Singh Thapa, Mathabarsingh Thapa was the seventh Prime Minister of Nepal and niece, Nain's daughter was Queen Tripurasundari of Nepal. The family of Sardar Amar Singh Thapa resided at Bagh Durbar.

Modern
The recent time Army Chief of Nepal Dharmapaal Barsingh Thapa belonged to this clan.

Notable Bagale Thapas 
Amar Singh Thapa, Nepalese politician and administrator (Bada Kaji), Supreme Commander of Western front in Anglo-Nepalese War, one of the National heroes of Nepal
Bhimsen Thapa, Nepalese Mukhtiyar (Prime Minister of Nepal), One of the National heroes of Nepal.
Bir Bhadra Thapa, Gorkhali courtier and commander at Unification of Nepal
Kashiram Thapa, Commander-in-Chief of Kantipur Kingdom
Amar Singh Thapa (born 1759), Sino-Nepalese War veteran and father of Mukhtiyar Bhimsen Thapa
Queen Tripurasundari of Nepal, (born as Lalita Sundari Thapa to Nain Singh Thapa), Queen Mother of Kingdom of Nepal
Mathabar Singh Thapa, Nepalese politician, military general and Prime Minister of Nepal
Ranadhoj Thapa, Nepalese politician and Deputy to Mukhtiyar Bhimsen Thapa
Nain Singh Thapa, Nepalese politician and military general
Ranajor Singh Thapa, Military Officer and Commander of Nahan Axis at Anglo-Nepalese War
Ranabir Singh Thapa, Nepalese politician and Commander of Makwanpur Axis at Anglo-Nepalese War
Bakhtawar Singh Thapa, Nepalese politician and Warrior at Anglo-Nepalese War
Ujir Singh Thapa, Military Officer and Commander of Butwal Axis at Anglo-Nepalese War
Dharmapaal Barsingh Thapa, Former Chief of the Nepalese Army
Shailesh Thapa Chhetri, Inspector General of Police (Nepal)

Gallery

See also 
Basnyat
Rana Dynasty
Shah Dynasty
Thapathana, place named after Bagale Thapas

References

Notes

Sources

External links 
Bagale Thapa Programme at Galkot, Baglung

 
Kshatriya communities
Khas people